If You Don't Save Paper is a 1948 British short film educating viewers on cutting down on paper wastage by using paper more efficiently. It stars Terry-Thomas, later famous for his roles in comedy films.

External links 

1948 films
British short films
Social guidance films
British black-and-white films
British comedy films
1948 comedy films
1940s English-language films
1940s British films
British educational films